Level Cross is an unincorporated community located in the Rockford Township of Surry County, North Carolina, United States.

Geography
The community is centered on the intersection of North Carolina Highway 268 and Siloam Road.    The community derives its name from this intersection as the two roads crossed at a relatively level spot compared to the surrounding area .  Prominent landmarks near the center of the community include Level Cross United Methodist Church.

References
 
 

Unincorporated communities in Surry County, North Carolina
Unincorporated communities in North Carolina